Guy Bois may refer to:
 Guy  Pène du Bois (1884–1958), American painter and art critic
 Guy Bois (historian) (1934–2019), French historian